North III is an electoral district in Lebanon, as per the 2017 vote law. The district elects 10 members of the Lebanese National Assembly - 7 Maronites and 3 Greek Orthodox. The constituency contains four 'minor districts', Batroun (corresponding to Batroun District, electing 2 Maronites), Bcharre (corresponding to Bcharre District, electing 2 Maronites), Koura (corresponding to Koura District, electing 3 Greek Orthodox]]) and Zghorta (corresponding to Zgharta, electing 3 Maronites).

Electorate
The electorate is predominantly Christian; 68.1% are Maronite, 20.7% Greek Orthodox, 8.94% Sunni, 0.93% Shia, 0.73% Greek Catholic, 0.38% from other Christian communities and 0.24% Alawite. Below data from 2017;

2018 election
Ahead of the 2018 Lebanese general election 4 lists were registered. The "Strong North" list, headed by Gebran Bassil, gathered the Free Patriotic Movement, the Independence Movement, the Future Movement, whilst the "Strong Republic Pulse" gathered the Lebanese Forces, the Kataeb Party and the Democratic Left Movement. The "With Us for the North and Lebanon" gathered the Marada Movement, the Syrian Social Nationalist Party and Boutros Harb whilst the civil society list "Kulluna Watani" (We are all National) gathered the Movement of Citizens in the State, Sabaa Party and Sah.

Result by lists

Result by candidate

References

Electoral districts of Lebanon